The Yokohama Yamate Chinese School is a Chinese-style primary and junior high school in Naka-ku, Yokohama, Japan. Serving levels kindergarten through ninth grade, it is one of two Chinese schools in Japan oriented towards Mainland China, and one of five Chinese schools total. As of 2008 Pan Minsheng is the principal.

It was formed after the 1952 split of the Yokohama Chinese School, which had been established by Sun Yat-sen. Yokohama Yamate was aligned to the People's Republic of China while the sister school Yokohama Overseas Chinese School was aligned to the Republic of China on Taiwan. In 2008 Pan stated that all of the graduating students pass entrance examinations to attend Japanese senior high schools.

Education
Classes are taught in both Japanese and Chinese, with each subject being taught in one particular language. Fifth through ninth graders take English classes. Most instruction at the kindergarten level is in Japanese. The school teaches Hanyu Pinyin and Simplified Chinese.

Student demographics
As of 1995 the school had 300 students, with 15% of the students being Japanese nationals who only spoke Japanese and the remainder being any of the following: Chinese-Japanese, Chinese students with mixed Japanese and Chinese parents, students with Chinese parents, and returnees from Mainland China.

As of 2008 it had 413 students: 10% were ethnic Japanese; 70% of the students were Japanese citizens and 30% were Chinese citizens.

Teacher demographics
As of 1995 the teaching staff consisted of four Japanese persons born in Japan, 19 Chinese persons born in Japan, and two persons born in Mainland China, resulting in a total of 25.

See also
 Chinese people in Japan
 Kobe Chinese School, the other PRC-oriented school in Japan
 List of Japanese international schools in Mainland China and Hong Kong
 List of junior high schools in Kanagawa Prefecture

References

Further reading

Available online:
 Arisawa, Shino (有澤 知乃; Tokyo Gakugei University International Student Exchange Center (留学生センター)). "(A Research Note)Music Education at Overseas Chinese Schools in Japan : The Cases of Yokohama Yamate Chinese School and Yokohama Overseas Chinese School" (研究ノート)中華学校における音楽教育 : 横浜山手中華学校と横浜中華学院を事例として; Archive" ((研究ノート)中華学校における音楽教育 : 横浜山手中華学校と横浜中華学院を事例として; Archive). Bulletin of Tokyo Gakugei University Humanities and Social Sciences II (東京学芸大学紀要. 人文社会科学系. II). 66, 205-215, 2015-01-30. Tokyo Gakugei University. See profile at CiNii. See profile at ETopia, Tokyo Gakugei University Repository (東京学芸大学リポジトリ). English abstract available.
 Baba, Hiroko (馬場 裕子; Ritsumeikan University大学院先端総合学術研究科). "An Analysis of Internationalization and Multiculturalism at Chinese Schools : Yokohama Yamate Chinese School and Kobe Chinese School" (大陸系中華学校による国際化・多文化化への試み : 横浜山手中華学校と神戸中華同文学校を事例に; Archive" (大陸系中華学校による国際化・多文化化への試み : 横浜山手中華学校と神戸中華同文学校を事例に; Archive). Core Ethics (コア・エシックス) 10, 203-214, 2014. Ritsumeikan University. See profile at CiNii. See profile at JAIRO. English abstract available.
 Wang, Xin (王 鑫; PhD student, Hyogo University of Teacher Education Joint Graduate School of Science of School Education). "Changes of the Overseas-Chinese school and regional characteristics in Japan: mainly about Kobe Chinese School and Yokohama Yamate Chinese School" (日本における華僑学校の変遷とその地域的特徴—神戸中華同文学校と横浜山手中華学校を中心に; Archive" (日本における華僑学校の変遷とその地域的特徴—神戸中華同文学校と横浜山手中華学校を中心に; Archive). Journal for the Science of Schooling (教育実践学論集) (10), 125-133, 2009-03. 兵庫教育大学大学院連合学校教育学研究科. See profile at CiNii. See profile at HEART (Hyokyo Educational and Academic Resources for Teachers) of Hyogo University of Teacher Education. English abstract available.

Not available online:
 清水谷(宍戸) 佳織. "Anniversary of Yokohama Yamate Chinese school: 1898-2004" (新刊紹介 横浜山手中華学園編『横浜山手中華学校百年校志 1898〜2004』). Journal of Chinese Overseas Studies (華僑華人研究) (3), 49-52, 2006. 日本華僑華人学会. See profile at CiNii.
 潘 民生. "The Past Present, and Future of Yokohama Yamate Chinese School" (横浜山手中華学校の過去、現在、未来 (特集 華人とは誰か : 教育とアイデンティティ)). 華僑華人研究 (8), 55-61, 2011. 日本華僑華人学会. See profile at CiNii.
 潘 民夫. "中日の文化と言語を教え両国の架け橋となる子どもたちを育てる--横浜山手中華学校 (特集 世界が見える日本の外国人学校)." The Immigration Newsmagazine (国際人流) 22(11), 11-14, 2009-11. 入管協会. See profile at CiNii.
 "創価学会が「(横浜)山手中華学校」を救う「深謀遠慮」 (激戦ワイド 「レッドクリフ」を越えて)." 週刊文春 50(47), 36-37, 2008-12-04. 文芸春秋. See profile at CiNii.
 藤原 智美. "教育シリーズ 第17弾 公教育を捨て「横浜山手中華学校」に進学を決断した親の本音とは 「二割は日本人生徒」中華学校の過熱人気." President (プレジデント) 43(19), 148-153, 2005-10-03. プレジデント社. See profile at CiNii.
 黄 丹青. "日本における中華学校のバイリンガル教育実践に関する一考察--横浜山手中華学校を事例として." 国立教育政策研究所紀要 134, 143-154, 2005-03. 国立教育政策研究所. See profile at CiNii.

External links
 Yokohama Yamate Chinese School /
  "横滨山手中华学校建校110周年 重金置地扩建新校" (Archive" (Archive). Overseas Chinese Affairs Office of the State Council. September 22, 2008.

International schools in Yokohama
Chinese international schools in Japan
Educational institutions established in 1952
Elementary schools in Japan
Naka-ku, Yokohama
1952 establishments in Japan